The 1994–95 Washington Capitals season was the team's 21st season of play. After stumbling to a 3–10–5 record by February 28, the Capitals caught a break in bringing up 20-year-old rookie goaltender Jim Carey from the Portland Pirates for their March 2 game against the New York Islanders. The Capitals edged the Islanders 4–3 and Carey made 21 saves. Carey would finish his rookie season with an impressive 18–6–3 record, a 2.13 goals against average (GAA) and four shutouts. With the help of Carey's superb goaltending, Washington would go on to win 19 of their final 30 games and finish in sixth place in the Eastern Conference, with a 22–18–8 record for 52 points. Peter Bondra had an excellent season, leading all NHL skaters in goals (34) and shorthanded goals (6).

Off-season

Regular season
The Capitals tied the Buffalo Sabres for the most short-handed goals scored (13) and tied the St. Louis Blues for the fewest short-handed goals allowed (2) during the regular season.

Final standings

Schedule and results

Playoffs

In the first round of the playoffs, the Capitals faced their old rivals from 1991, 1992 and 1994, the Pittsburgh Penguins. Washington had defeated Pittsburgh in the first round one year earlier and were hoping to do the same in 1995. The series started out well for the Capitals, as they defeated the Penguins 5-4 in the opening game. In Game 2, Washington held a 3–1 lead after two periods, but Pittsburgh scored four times in the third period to win 5–3 and tie the series at 1–1. Washington won Games 3 and 4 at home by identical scores of 6–2. The two teams skated to a 5–5 tie in Game 5, and with just 4:30 into the first overtime period, Luc Robitaille scored his fourth of the playoffs to keep the Penguins alive in the series. Peter Bondra, Dale Hunter, Jaromir Jagr and Kevin Stevens each scored twice in the game. Leading three games to two, the Capitals had a chance to eliminate the Penguins on home ice in Game 6, but goaltender Jim Carey struggled, allowing six goals on just 13 shots. Washington got only one shot (by Keith Jones) past Pittsburgh goaltender Ken Wregget, who made 30 saves. The Penguins went on to win the game 7–1 and tied the series at three games apiece. Jaromir Jagr, Luc Robitaille and Tomas Sandstrom each scored twice. In Game 7, Carey played better than he had in Game 6, stopping 15 of 17 shots, but Ken Wregget was solid again and stopped all 33 Washington shots to get the shutout. Troy Murray would add an empty-net goal to give Pittsburgh a 3–0 win and the series victory, four games to three. It was the second time in four years that the Penguins had defeated the Capitals after trailing 3–1 in a playoff series.

Player statistics

Regular season
Scoring

Goaltending

Playoffs
Scoring

Goaltending

Note: GP = Games played; G = Goals; A = Assists; Pts = Points; +/- = Plus/minus; PIM = Penalty minutes; PPG=Power-play goals; SHG=Short-handed goals; GWG=Game-winning goals
      MIN=Minutes played; W = Wins; L = Losses; T = Ties; GA = Goals against; GAA = Goals against average; SO = Shutouts; SA=Shots against; SV=Shots saved; SV% = Save percentage;

Awards and records

Transactions

Draft picks
Washington's draft picks at the 1994 NHL Entry Draft held at the Hartford Civic Center in Hartford, Connecticut.

See also
 1994–95 NHL season

References
 

W
W
Washington Capitals seasons
Cap
Cap